The women's 50m breaststroke events at the 2022 World Para Swimming Championships were held at the Penteada Olympic Swimming Complex in Madeira between 12 and 18 June.

Medalists

Results

SB2
Final
Six swimmers from five nations took part.

SB3
Final
Eight swimmers from six nations took part.

References

2022 World Para Swimming Championships
2022 in women's swimming